The 2016 Ondo State gubernatorial election occurred in Nigeria on 26 November 2016, the APC nominee Rotimi Akeredolu won election, defeating Eyitayo Jegede of the PDP.

Rotimi Akeredolu emerged APC gubernatorial candidate after scoring 669 votes and defeating his closest rival, Segun Abraham, who received 635 votes, Olusola Oke came third with 583 votes and Ajayi Boroffice had 471 votes. He picked Agboola Ajayi as his running mate. Eyitayo Jegede was the PDP candidate with Prince John Ola Mafo as his running mate. 28 candidates contested in the election.

Electoral system
The Governor of Ondo State is elected using the plurality voting system.

Primary election

APC primary
The APC primary election was held on September 4, 2016. Rotimi Akeredolu won the primary election polling 669 votes against 3 other candidates. His closest rival, Segun Abraham, had 635 votes, Olusola Oke came third with 583 votes and Ajayi Boroffice received 471 votes.

PDP primary
The PDP primary election was held on August 22, 2016. Eyitayo Jegede won the primary election polling 760 votes against Hon. Saka Lawal, the deputy governorship candidate of the PDP in the 2012 governorship election, who received 22 votes.

Results
A total number of 28 candidates registered with the Independent National Electoral Commission to contest in the election.

The total number of registered voters in the state was 1,647,973, while 584,997 voters were accredited. Total number of votes cast was 580,887, while number of valid votes was 551,272. Rejected votes were 29,615.

By local government area
Here are the results of the election by local government area for the two major parties. The total valid votes of 551,272 represents the 27 political parties that participated in the election. Blue represents LGAs won by Rotimi Akeredolu. Green represents LGAs won by Eyitayo Jegede.

References 

Ondo State gubernatorial election
Ondo State gubernatorial election
Ondo State gubernatorial elections